Amir Mizroch (born December 6, 1975) is an Israeli journalist now working for Israeli tech NGO Start-Up Nation Central as Director of Communications. He previously worked at strategic communications company Milltown Partners as Director, Technology. Before that he was the technology editor for Europe, The Middle East and Africa at The Wall Street Journal, based in London. Before that he presented a current affairs radio show on TLV1. He was founding editor of the English Edition of Israel Hayom, Israel's most widely circulated daily newspaper. Amir spent 8 years at The Jerusalem Post, serving as managing editor – Internet, news editor, features editor, and eventually as executive editor.

Early life and education
Mizroch was born in Israel and raised in South Africa, returning to Israel in 2000 after college. He has a Bachelor of Journalism and Media Studies from Rhodes University in Grahamstown, South Africa.

Career
Mizroch first worked as an investigative news producer at the Mail & Guardian television in Johannesburg, South Africa. In 2002 he joined The Jerusalem Post, serving as managing editor of the paper's website jpost.com. He was news editor from 2004 to April 2010. On April 21 he was promoted to executive editor and features editor. He resigned in February 2011. He joined Israel Hayom in April 2011, and left in November 2013.

During that time he contributed to the Danger Room blog of Wired Magazine.

On 16 January 2014, it was announced that he will be joining The Wall Street Journal as technology editor for Europe, the Middle East and Africa.

Honors
Certificate of Merit award for Journalism from the B'nai B'rith World Center for American Jewish Communities blog. 
Bertelsmann Stiftung - German Israeli Young Leaders Exchange program

References 

Moderator for Do The Write Thing 2006 Program at GA
What was Bielski thinking when he talked about American Jews?

Articles 
The weather is with Hamas The Jerusalem Post Dec 31, 2008
Analysis: An unforgivable act in an unforgiving situation The Jerusalem Post Dec 18, 2008
Jews Lost and Found in India
How Free Explains Israel's Flotilla Fiasco  June 2, 2010

External links 
 Forecast Highs
 Ten Lost Tribes Blog (Jerusalem Post website)

1975 births
Israeli Jews
Israeli journalists
The Jerusalem Post people
Living people